The Excise, Taxation & Narcotics Control Department is a department of Government of Punjab, Pakistan. The Excise, Taxation & Narcotics Control Department collects various taxes and duties and suggests ways and means for additional resource mobilization in the Province. 
 
Various type of taxes department collects include:
 Motor Vehicle Tax
 Property Tax
 Excise Duty
 Professional Tax
 Entertainment Duty
 Luxury House Tax on Houses & Farm Houses
 Cotton Fee

See also 
 Ministry of Finance (Pakistan)
 Department of Revenue (Pakistan)
 Federal Board of Revenue
 Finance Department
 Economy of Punjab

References

External links
 Excise and Taxation Department Finance Department

Departments of Government of Punjab, Pakistan
Economy of Punjab, Pakistan
Taxation in Pakistan